Kullu is a municipal council town that serves as the administrative headquarters of the Kullu district of the Indian state of Himachal Pradesh.

Kullu Valley is a broad open valley formed by the Beas River between Manali and Larji. This valley is known for its temples and its hills covered with pine and deodar forest and sprawling apple orchards. The course of the Beas river, originating from Beas Kund presents a succession of hillside settlements studded amongst forests of deodar that tower above pine trees on the lower rocky ridges. Together with the river Beas running through the valley, the town of Kullu offers truly magnificent  views. Kullu Valley is sandwiched between the Pir Panjal, Lower Himalayan and Great Himalayan Ranges, located in Northern India, 497 k.m. away from the capital of India.

History

Historical references about the Kullu valley dates back to ancient Hindu literary works of Ramayana, Mahabharata and the Puranas. During Vedic period several small republics known as "Janapada" existed which were later conquered by the Nanda Empire, Mauryan Empire, Gupta Empire, Pala Dynasty and Karkoṭa Empire. After a brief period of supremacy by King Harshavardhana, the region was once again divided into several local powers headed by chieftains, including some Rajput principalities, these principalities were later conquered by Mughal Empire, Maratha Empire, Sikh Empire.

The name Kullu derives from the word "Kulant Peeth", meaning "end of the habitable world". As per legends, during the Great Flood, Manu visited this valley but was unable to cross the Rohtang pass. He named the last settlement he found as Kulant Peeth and chose to settle and meditate in what has now become the town of Manali (Manu's Place). The name further devolved into "Kulut", as the kingdom was known for a long time; before finally being known by the current name of Kullu or Kulu.

The Buddhist pilgrim monk Xuanzang visited the Kullu Valley in 634 or 635 CE. He described it as a fertile region completely surrounded by mountains, about 3,000 li in circuit, with a capital 14 or 15 li in circumference. There were some twenty Buddhist monasteries, with about 1,000 monks, most of whom were Mahayanist. There were also some fifteen Hindu temples, and both faiths occupied the region. There were meditation caves near the mountain passes inhabited by both Buddhist and Hindus. The country is said to have produced gold, silver, red copper, crystal lenses and bell-metal.

Kullu got its first motorable access only after Indian Independence. The long centuries of seclusion have, however, allowed the area to retain a considerable measure of its traditional charm. The road through the Kullu Valley and Lahaul is now paved all the way, to connect and provide the major access route between the northern Indian plains to Leh in Ladakh.

Geography 

It lies on the bank of Beas River. A major tributary, Sarvari, (derived from "Shiv-Baardi") leads to the less explored and steeper Lug-valley on the west. On the east of Kullu lies a broad mountainous ridge having the village-temples of Bijli Mahadev, Anant Nag and Peej. Beyond the ridge lies Manikaran valley, along the Parvati river which joins Beas at in Bhuntar. On the south of Kullu lie the towns of Bhuntar and Aut, leading to Anni, Banjar, the Sainj Valley) and Mandi (in Mandi district). Historically Kullu was accessible from Shimla via the Sainj valley, or through passes on the west leading to Jogindernagar and onto the district of Kangra. 40 km. north lies the rather famous town of Manali. A few hours of a very winding car ride  on the main highway leads to Rohtang Pass and the source of the Beas river, at 13,500 ft, 4110 m. The same road continues on to the Lahaul and Spiti Valley(now also accessible by Atal tunnel). One can see an enormous change in the climate as one climbs up the windward side of the ranges to proceed to the leeward and much drier plateaus to the north of Manali. Lahaul and Spiti are inhabited mostly by Tibetan descendants, and have entirely different customs, food, clothing, and culture than the rest of India. 

The valley has varied biodiversity. It has some of the rarest of animals like the Himalayan tahr, western tragopan, monal, Himalayan brown bear and the snow leopard. The Great Himalayan National Park (GHNP) is also located here (near Banjar). The park was built in 1984. In order to protect the flora and fauna of this Himalayan area, many places are declared as wildlife sanctuaries, such as: Khokhan Sanctuary, Kais Sanctuary, Tirthan Sanctuary, Kanawar Sanctuary, Rupi Baba Sanctuary, Great Himalayan National Park and Van Vihar Manali.

Evenings and mornings are cold during winters. Annual highest temperature in summer ranges from  during May to August. Months of July and August are rainy because of monsoon, having around  rainfall monthly. Climate is pleasant in October and November.

Demographics 
 India census, Kullu had a population of 437,903. Males in Kullu are 225,452 whereas females are 212,451. Sex ratio of Kullu is 942 females per 1000 males which is higher than national sex ratio . The average literacy rate of Kullu is 79.40% whereas male literacy rate is 87.39% and female literacy rate is 70.91%. The people speak the Kullui language.

Administrative
Kullu town, as the administrative headquarters of Kullu district, has the offices of Deputy Commissioner, the Superintendent of Police and the District courts.  It is also the largest and the most varied constituency of Lok Sabha, the lower house of the parliament of India. Kullu administration was transferred from Sultan Pur (former capital) to present Kullu town.

Transport

Air
The airport is also known as Kullu-Manali airport and has a runway more than a kilometre long. Indian Airlines and some private airlines have regular flights to the airport. Himalayan Bulls in collaboration with Deccan Charters started flights on Kullu-Chandigarh-Kullu sector beginning 2 April 2014 with 2 to 3 unscheduled flights each day in eight-seater planes. The Pane Tickets Usually has a very High price.

Chandigarh airport is the nearest large airport.

Road
Kullu can be reached from Delhi by national highway NH 1 up to Chandigarh and from there by national highway NH21 that passes through Bilaspur, Sundernagar and Mandi towns. It's almost a 12 hours journey.

Railways

Kullu doesn't have any Railtracks until now. But Government has surveyed the land for railway construction. It may take some time though.

Economy 
See Economy section in Kullu district.

Tourism 

For places of interest, festivals, and outdoor sports in Kullu, see Attractions section in Kullu district.

References

Further reading

Francke, A. H. (1914, 1926). Antiquities of Indian Tibet. Two Volumes. Calcutta. 1972 reprint: S. Chand, New Delhi.
 Hutchinson, J. & J. PH Vogel (1933). History of the Panjab Hill States, Vol. II. 1st edition: Govt. Printing, Pujab, Lahore, 1933. Reprint 2000. Department of Language and Culture, Himachal Pradesh. Chapter X Kulu State, pp. 413–473.
Watters, Thomas. (1904–1905): On Yuan Chwang’s Travels in India. 1904–1905. London. Royal Asiatic Society. Reprint: Delhi. Munshiram Manoharlal. 1973.

External links 

 News and videos of Kullu
 Himachal Tourism website
 International Roerich Memorial Trust

 
Hill stations in Himachal Pradesh
Cities and towns in Kullu district